Fazal-e-Maula is a Pakistani politician who had been a member of the Provincial Assembly of Khyber Pakhtunkhwa from July 2022 till January 2023.

Political career 
He was elected to the Provincial Assembly of Khyber Pakhtunkhwa as a candidate of Pakistan Tehreek-e-Insaf from Constituency PK-7 (Swat-VI) in a 2022 by-election that was held due to the death of Waqar Ahmad Khan, the former MPA from this constituency. He received 17,395 votes and defeated Hussain Ahmed of the Awami National Party, who received 14,604 votes. He took the oath of office on 18 July 2022.

References 

Provincial Assembly of Khyber Pakhtunkhwa
Pakistani politicians
Living people
1950 births